Rune War is the twenty-fourth book of the award-winning Lone Wolf book series created by Joe Dever.

Gameplay
Lone Wolf books rely on a combination of thought and luck.  Certain statistics such as combat skill and endurance attributes are determined randomly before play (reading).  The player is then allowed to choose which Kai disciplines or skills he or she possess.  This number depends directly on how many books in the series have been completed ("Kai rank").  With each additional book completed, the player chooses one additional Kai discipline.  In this first book, the player starts with five disciplines.

Reception
Chris Read reviewed Rune War for Arcane magazine, rating it a 6 out of 10 overall. Read comments that "the book is nicely illustrated and the narrative is generally good with plenty of decision-making and 'interaction' with NPCs. Naturally, Lady Luck plays her fickle part, but your skills and common sense are much more relevant to your success. This, above all, gives the book a good feel."

References

External links
Gamebooks - Lone Wolf
Origins of Lone Wolf
Book entry

Lone Wolf (gamebooks)
1995 fiction books